KSOP-FM (104.3 FM, "Z104") is a radio station broadcasting a country music format. Licensed to Salt Lake City, Utah, United States, the station serves the Salt Lake City area.  The station is currently owned by Ksop, Inc.  Its studios are located along Redwood Road, and the transmitter site is atop Farnsworth Peak.

KSOP-FM also has a sister station with the same call sign on AM 1370 kHz.

On August 1, 2011, at midnight, after stunting with a countdown of 10 popular non-country pop songs, KSOP-FM rebranded as "Z104".

On November 15, 2017, at approximately 12pm (MST) the station switched on its HD transmitter. Allowing for clearer radio, album art in car, and other HD options.

Translators
In addition to the main station, KSOP-FM is relayed by ten additional translators to widen its broadcast area.

References

External links

SOP-FM
Country radio stations in the United States
Radio stations established in 1964
1964 establishments in Utah